U.S. Route 19 (US 19) is a north–south U.S. Highway in the Eastern United States. Despite encroaching Interstate Highways, the route has remained a long-haul road, connecting the Gulf of Mexico with Lake Erie.

The highway's southern terminus is at Memphis, Florida, which is just south of St. Petersburg at an intersection with U.S. Route 41.  Its northern terminus is in Erie, Pennsylvania, at an intersection with U.S. Route 20 about two miles (3 km) from the shores of Lake Erie.

Route description

|-
|FL
|align="right"|262.0
|align="right"|421.6
|-
|GA
|align="right"|348.0
|align="right"|560.1
|-
|NC
|align="right"|145.0
|align="right"|233.4
|-
|19E
|align="right"|75.9
|align="right"|122.1
|-
|19W
|align="right"|62.6
|align="right"|100.7
|-
|TN
|align="right"|11.8
|align="right"|19.0
|-
|VA
|align="right"|88.9
|align="right"|143.0
|-
|WV
|align="right"|249.0
|align="right"|400.7
|-
|PA
|align="right"|195.0
|align="right"|313.8
|-
|Total
|align="right"|1,438.2
|align="right"|2,314.6
|}

Florida

US 19 runs  along Florida's west coast from an interchange with US 41 in Memphis, south of St. Petersburg, and continues to the Georgia border north of Monticello. US 19 remains independent of I-75, even as the routes converge in the Tampa Bay Area. The route is co-signed with I-275 over the Sunshine Skyway Bridge, a cable-stayed bridge over the mouth of Tampa Bay, US 98 between Chassahowitzka and Perry,  US 27 Alt. between Chiefland and Perry, and US 27 between and Perry and Capps.

The "secret" designation for US 19 in Florida, between Memphis and Perry, is SR 55. Between Perry and Capps, it follows SR 20, and between Capps and the Georgia border, it follows SR 57.

According to a 2005 Dateline NBC report, part of US 19 in Florida may be the most dangerous road in the United States. A Highway Patrol test period beginning in 1998 and ending in 2003, as mandated by the National Highway Traffic Safety Administration, showed the stretch of US 19 from Pasco County to Pinellas County to average approximately 52 deaths a year, or 262 deaths in the five-year duration of the study; 100 of these deaths were pedestrian related, making US 19 the worst road to walk on in these two counties. Multiple efforts to improve US 19 have been suggested to the FDOT, among them, an overpass strictly for left-turn lanes.

Currently, US 19 between Clearwater and St. Petersburg is getting a freeway-style upgrade due to the cancellation of an extension of Interstate 375 in the late 1970s.

Georgia

US 19 enters Georgia just south of Thomasville as Lee Highway, concurrent with SR 3.  It continues north, passing through Albany, Americus, Ellaville, Butler, Thomaston, and Zebulon.  It becomes concurrent with US 41 in Griffin.  It then proceeds through the western tip of Henry County, passing through Hampton, home of the Atlanta Motor Speedway, and continues north through Clayton County and Jonesboro, entering Atlanta.

US 19/US 41 travels through the south side of Atlanta as Metropolitan Parkway (formerly Stewart Avenue) and through Downtown Atlanta as Northside Drive. The concurrencies with US 41 and SR 3 end when US 19 turns east onto 14th Street in Midtown, beginning a concurrency with SR 9. It then turns north on Peachtree Street until it intersects with SR 141 in Buckhead and becomes Roswell Road. US 19 then continues north through Sandy Springs until it reaches I-285's north side.

US 19 leaves I-285 to travel through the northern suburbs of Atlanta along SR 400. Most of this section is a limited-access road with four lanes in each direction, becoming two lanes in each direction as the highway continues away from the northern suburbs of Atlanta. It picks back up as Lee Highway north of Atlanta. The last major town it travels through in Georgia is Blairsville.

North Carolina

US 19 is co-signed with US 129 from the Georgia line to Murphy as Lee Highway, then is co-signed with US 74, as well as US 129 as far as Graham County. US 129 vears away from 19, heading north to Robbinsville, and continuing to Maryville, Tennessee. US 19 and US 74 are co-signed as far as Ela, after which US 74 veers south, leaving US 19 to head into the Great Smoky Mountains. US 19 passes through the Eastern Cherokee Indian Reservation. For a brief time, US 19 is co-signed with US 276. Then US 19 is co-signed with US 23 from Lake Junaluska  to Mars Hill (and with US 70 in Asheville), which closely parallels I-40 and then Future I-26.

Just north of Mars Hill, US 19 continues solo to Cane River, where US 19 splits: US 19E towards Burnsville and US 19W towards Erwin, Tennessee.

U.S. Route 19E

Traversing  from Cane River, North Carolina to Bluff City, Tennessee, US 19E first goes east to Burnsville and Spruce Pine, then north along the banks of the North Toe River to Cranberry and Elk Park, before crossing the North Carolina/Tennessee state line.  Heading northeast, it goes through Roan Mountain, Hampton and Elizabethton, rendezvousing with US 19W in Bluff City.

U.S. Route 19W

Traversing  from Cane River, North Carolina to Bluff City, Tennessee, US 19W goes immediately north along the banks of the Cane River to the communities of Ramseytown and Sioux, then northwest through the Unaka Range, crossing the North Carolina/Tennessee state line.  At Ernestville, US 19W joins with I-26/US 23 and proceeds through Erwin, Unicoi and Johnson City.  In Johnson City, it switches partners to US 11E along Bristol Highway, rendezvousing with US 19E in Bluff City.

Tennessee

US 19 starts again in Bluff City, heading northeast along the Volunteer Parkway (and concurrency with US 11E) to Bristol.  In downtown Bristol, US 19 crosses the Tennessee/Virginia state line on State Street.

Virginia

US 19 goes northeast from Bristol, parallel to I-81, until Abingdon.  It then heads north to Lebanon, through the Clinch Mountains, then northeast again through the towns of Claypool Hill, Tazewell, and then finally to Bluefield, where it enters West Virginia.

West Virginia

US 19 enters West Virginia as a four-lane highway in Bluefield, where it narrows to two lanes as it winds northward. It later parallels I-77/I-64 until it reaches Beckley, where it goes northeasterly on an expressway-grade four-lane highway. From there, it runs concurrent with I-79 from exit 57 to exit 67 at Flatwoods. Then, it exits and reverts to a two-lane highway, more or less following the route of I-79 as it passes through Weston, Clarksburg, Fairmont, and Morgantown before crossing into Pennsylvania. The distance from Beckley from I-79 is also known as ADHS Corridor L. It allows traffic to the Pittsburgh area to bypass Charleston, and is thus part of a main link from Charlotte and Myrtle Beach to Pittsburgh.

US 19 through Summersville, West Virginia has been dubbed the "world's largest speed trap".

Pennsylvania

US 19 is closely paralleled by I-79 for its entire length. From the state line, it goes north to Washington and then through Pittsburgh.  In downtown Pittsburgh, US 19 crosses the Ohio River via West End Bridge.  In Cranberry Township, north of Pittsburgh, US 19 shares a major junction between I-76 (Pennsylvania Turnpike) and I-79, via the Cranberry Connector.  US 19 crosses I-80 in the East Lackawannock Township.  Near Erie, it crosses I-90 before going through the downtown area, ending at US 20 (26th Street).

ADHS corridors
US 19 overlaps with three corridors that are part of the Appalachian Development Highway System (ADHS), which is part of Appalachian Regional Commission (ARC).  Passed in 1965, the purpose of ADHS is to generate economic development in previously isolated areas, supplement the interstate system, connect Appalachia to the interstate system, and provide access to areas within the Region as well as to markets in the rest of the nation.

 Corridor A – From I-285, in Sandy Springs, Georgia, to I-40, near Clyde, North Carolina.  US 19/SR 400 overlaps from Sandy Springs to SR 141, near Cumming in Georgia.  The entire section is a controlled-access highway.
 Corridor A-1 – From SR 141, near Cumming, Georgia, to SR 53, near Dawsonville, Georgia.  The entire  section of US 19/SR 400 is authorized for ADHS funding.  The entire route is a divided four-lane highway, with the southern section a controlled-access highway and the northern section being a limited-access road.
 Corridor K – From I-75, in Cleveland, Tennessee, to US 23, in Dillsboro, North Carolina.  US 19 overlaps from US 64/US 74, near Murphy, to US 74 (Great Smoky Mountains Expressway), near Bryson City.  The routing is a four-lane limited-access road from near Murphy to Andrews; the rest is two-lane through the Nantahala Gorge.  Future plans include building a new four-lane limited-access road from Andrews, through Robbinsville, to Stecoah, bypassing the Nantahala Gorge.
 Corridor L – From I-64/I-77, near Beckley, West Virginia, to I-79, near Sutton, West Virginia.  Of the  section of US 19, only  was authorized for ADHS funding.  This corridor is considered complete, with a divided four-lane limited-access road with interchanges at major intersections.
 Corridor Q – From US 23/US 119, in Shelbiana, Kentucky, to I-81, near Christiansburg, Virginia. US 19 overlaps from US 460, in Claypool Hill, Virginia, to US 460, in Princeton, West Virginia.  The entire route is a mostly divided four lane limited-access road with interchanges at major intersections.

History

Florida
US 19 first entered Florida in 1929. It underwent two route shifts, the first in 1933 and the second in 1946, which adjusted it to its current alignment. US 19 was extended to its southern terminus of Memphis in September 1954, when the original Sunshine Skyway Bridge opened to traffic.

Starting around 1956 US19 was 4-laned, initially in the Perry area, working north toward the Georgia border.  The entire route in Florida was 4-laned by 1972.

The planned St. Petersburg–Clearwater Expressway, or Pinellas Beltway, would have followed the current alignment of "Alt 19" from I-275 to Clearwater, Florida. The intersection of Seminole Boulevard and Bay Pines Boulevard is a remnant of this proposed road. The beltway road was proposed in 1974, but it was dead by 1980.

South of Griffin, U.S. 19 Joins U.S. 41. Near The Business Route. U.S. 19 Travels into a short freeway in Griffin. In Downtown Atlanta, U.S. 19 Leaves U.S. 41. The Highway travels on Interstate 85 then leaves. U.S 19 travels on Interstate 285 to a former toll road S.R. 400. U.S 19 Then Travels From Blairsville, Canal Lake, and Ivylog to the North Carolina Boarder

North Carolina
In North Carolina, US 19 was NC 10 from the Georgia state line to Asheville, NC 29 from Asheville to Madison County, NC 69 to a point near the Tennessee state line, and either NC 194 or NC 694 for a short distance south of the Tennessee state line.

The original US 19 in Yancey, Mitchell, and Avery Counties mostly followed the route now designated US 19E. US 19W in Yancey County was US 19-23 in 1935, and what is now US 19E was US 19A. The US 19E and US 19W designations have been used since 1930.

Prior to 1948, US 19 between Ela and Waynesville essentially followed the route of present-day US 74. Then, this road was called US 19 Alternate (US 19-A) and the section of NC 28 From Ela to Cherokee and the section of NC 293 from Cherokee to near Waynesville became US 19. Improvements were made, including a new section of highway west of Lake Junaluska.

Around 1956, US 19-23 was widened to four lanes from Lake Junaluska to Canton.

By 1970, a section of US 19 west of Murphy, also designated US 64 (and later US 74), was widened to four lanes.

In January 1983, after improvements to US 19-A had made it similar to an Interstate Highway, the state proposed designating US 19-A as US 19 Bypass. At one point, changing US 19-A to US 19 was considered, but businesses in Maggie Valley opposed the idea of their highway being changed to US 19-A. US 19-A became the Great Smoky Mountains Expressway.

Tennessee
US 19 Originality went from NC to US 511.

In 1928, US 19 was extended with US 511 to Bristol and into Virginia.

In 1930, US 19 south was truncated to Bluff City (current TN 44/390 jct), as US 19E was assigned to US 19 south to North Carolina.

This is still US 19E except: Old Hwy 19E/Buck Creek Rd east of Shell Creek; Carter St, Main St, Conway St and Cloud Land Dr in Roan Mountain; Crabtree Rd and Old Rock Quarry Rd west of Roan Mountain; Little Mountain Church Rd; Holtsclaw Rd; Herman Johnson Loop; J D Whitehead Rd; Old Hwy 19E, Schoolhouse Rd and Dave Simerly Rd in Tiger Valley; Rittertown Rd south of Hampton; Church St and 1st St through Hampton; Mill Pond Rd in the Valley Forge area.

The quite winding alignment where it crosses the Doe River twice is completely abandoned; State Line Rd/Johnson Ave/Sycamore St/Broad St through Elizabethton, plus today's TN 400 and Bristol Hwy/Elizabethton Hwy/Old Elizabethton hwy to Bluff City.

In 1931 or 1932, US 19 south was extended over US 19W to the new US 19E-19W split in Hillcrest (current TN 44/Elizabethton Hwy jct)

Virginia
Although an original US Highway, US 19 does not appear on the 1926 Official (which shows other US routes) nor the 1927 Clasons. It does appear on a mid-1927 Official map. It ran generally as it does today. In this routing, US 19 was added to:

US 11 and VA 10 from the Tennessee line to Abingdon.

VA 106 from Abingdon to Hansonville

VA 112 from Hansonville to Lebanon

VA 11 from Lebanon to the West Virginia Line

Here is a more detailed look at the history of US 19 from south to north

Initially, US 19 entered Virginia via Pennsylvania Ave int Bristol, TN, then used State St west to Front St north to Spencer St northeast to Mary St east to Goodson St north to Danville Ave east to Fairview St north to Massachusetts Av east to Texas Av north which becomes Old Abingdon Hwy. which runs back into US 11-19 near the I-81 interchange.

US 19 followed today's US 11 approaching Abingdon, then used Colonial Ave and crossed the railroad to modern US 11 at roughly the Bytt St location, then US 58 ALT northwest. US 19 followed today's US 19-58A to Hansonville except: SR 766 near Abingdon; SR 633 loop at Butts; SR 775 at Greendale; SR 876/802 at Holton

Leaving Hansonville, US 19 used today's 19 up to SR 674, then abandoned alignment on the north side to Sunset Dr; US 19; SR 841 (except initially used SR 758 loop) to US 19 Bus; tiny bit of 19 Bus; Gilbert St/Old Fincastle Rd; VA 82; US 19 Bus through Lebanon.

East of Lebanon, US 19 used SR 656 loop back to 19. After a brief stretch of today's US 19, US 19 followed the SR 872 loop near VA 80 EB. US 19 followed more of today's 19 but near VA 80 WB stayed north of the creek on Old Rosedale Hwy and some abandoned alignments until around SR 644. East of here, US 19 more closely followed it current path although in the field it appears old alignment pieces are visible to the north side.

Before VA 369, US 19 originally used SR 770 to cross into Tazewell County, then SR 609 north back to US 19. US 19 followed its current path to Claypool Hill except it used the SR 705 loop. At Pounding Mill, US 19 used SR 637 but otherwise followed US 19-460 and then Bus US 19-460 to VA 16 ALT.

Initially, US 19 followed Old Fincastle Tpk in western Tazewell, then current US 19 Bus through Tazewell, tehn Ben Bolt Rd east to VA 61. US 19 then followed VA 61 north to SR 678 Market St. US 19 followed SR 678 north to SR 645 east which used to connect back to modern 19-460.

US 19 followed today's 19 to Bluefield except: SR 781; SR 680 loops in Springville; SRs 665 and 744/1520 Shannandale. There are other visible unnumbered loops that are visible to the north side of US 19-460. In Bluefield US 19 used Greever and East Sts

West Virginia

Appeared in December 1926 as an original US Highway, replacing WV 4 from Bluefield to Westover and WV 30 from Westover to Pennsylvania.

Note that the original description of US 19 in the 1925 WVDOT Annual Report had US 19 ending at US 60 Gauley Bridge and the 1926 Official Maps of both Virginia and West Virginia show this, but by the time the US route system went live in late 1926, US 19 did extend all the way through the Mountaineer State.

The road from Beckwith to US 60 was completed as new construction in 1926. It is unclear if US 19 was briefly part of the old route via Kanawha Falls which became part of WV 61 (now CR 13).

In 1929, US 19 was rerouted at Belva to the current WV 39 crossing of Twentymile Creek. The old route used today's CR 16/6 which no longer crosses the railroad and abandoned routing northwest to the Creek crossing which remained many decades past but is now gone along WV 16 north of the WV 39 jct.

About 1931 (WVDOT Annual Report), US 19-21 was removed from CR 19/19 Cherry Creek Cir and CR 119/8 Lamar Cir in Cherry Creek; CR 19/17 Marshall Cir all between Ghent and Shady Spring; also CR 19/28 Ransom Dr, CR 119/20 Little Vine Dr, and CR 19/14 Old US 19 loops above Shady Spring.

Also about 1931 (WVDOT Annual Report), US 19-21 was rebuilt from Skelton to Mount Hope and removed from CR 19/5 and CR 4 Prosperity Rd through Prosperity; CR 16/68 Bradley School Rd; CR 19/1 Maple Ln (no longer connects to), CR 1/25, CR 19/43 Sherwood Rd, CR 21/8 Sherwood Heights Rd

About 1934, US 19 was given new routing between Bluefield and Princeton. The old route became CR 25 Old Princeton Rd out of Bluefield; CR 25 Mercer Mall Rd to Edison (a bit of this is now WV 123); WV 71 legs (now CR 19/33 Maple Acres Rd to Glenwood; Glenwood/Green Valley/Old Bluefield Rds CR 19/29 from Glenwood to Princeton).

Also about 1934 (WVDOT Annual Report), the original Beckley Bypass was completed. It is referred to as "Alternate Route" through at least 1936. Then by 1940, it appears mainline US 19 was moved onto it, leaving behind US 19 ALT (now WV 16, CR 21/5, more WV 16, and all of WV 210) through Beckley.

Also about 1934 (WVDOT Annual Report), US 19-21 was put on mostly new construction from Oak Hill to Fayetteville, leaving behind CR 19/2 Broadway Ave and CR 19/1 Nickelville Rd.

About 1935 (WVDOT Annual Report), US 19-21 was removed from Covington and Piney Creek Rds near Raleigh (south edge of Beckley)

Also about 1935 (WVDOT Annual Report), US 19-21 was put on new construction between Glen Jean and Oak Hill leaving behind CR 20 (now CR 21/20) from Glen Jean to Whipple Jct and CR 15 from Whipple Jct to Oak Hill.

Also about 1935 (WVDOT Annual Report), US 19-21 was removed from CR 21/4 Old Court St north of Fayetteville.

Also about 1935 (WVDOT Annual Report), US 19 was removed from Colasessano Dr (brick pavement!) which no longer crosses Buffalo Creek to Old Pennsylvania Ave north of Fairmont

About 1936 (WVDOT Annual Report), US 19-21 was removed from today's CR 119/6 Sheloh Cir and CR 119/2 Madoc Cir in Cool Ridge

In 1936 or 1937, US 19 was removed from CR 19/9 and CR 19/10 Robinson Run Rd in Bowlby.

Between 1947-49, US 19 was rerouted to run directly from Beckley to Summersville as an addition to WV 41. The old route through Fayetteville to Gauley Bridge remained part of US 21 (now WV 16 except US 19 used WV 211 through Mt. Hope) while Gauley River to Summersville became an extended WV 39.

Pennsylvania

For many years the Venango Path was a Native American trail between the Forks of the Ohio (present day Pittsburgh) and Presque Isle, Pennsylvania, United States of America. Some of the modern US 19 follows the same path as this ancient trail. If you take U.S. 19 from Pittsburgh across the Allegheny and follow it to Perrysville, then you are on the old Venango trail path. Continue to Wexford and cross Brush Creek at Warrendale. Here, the path and modern road separate for a time. The path goes across fields while the road parallels it - from a distance of 3/4 mile to the west - for about 3 1/2 miles to Ogle. (From “Indian Paths Of Pennsylvania").

US 19 in Pennsylvania has maintained a similar alignment for much of its history. In 1928, US 19 was moved to its current route between Pittsburgh and Meadville. The West End Bridge in Pittsburgh was completed in 1932, and US 19 was realigned to cross the bridge. In 1936, US 19 was moved to its current alignment between Zelienople and Harmony. Through the 1940s and 1950s, different parts of US 19 were widened.

In 1987, the Phase One project started to connect two sections of Ohio River Boulevard near Western Avenue and Chateau Street. Phase Two of the project included a new interchange between the PA 65 expressway (concurrent with US 19 west of the interchange) and the West End Bridge. The bridge was closed for two years for construction, but reopened in 1991, while construction finished in 1992.

In 2003, the Pennsylvania Department of Transportation (PennDOT) started a project to build a US 19 tunnel under the Norfolk Southern Railway, as well as align the West End Bypass with the West End Circle, the intersection of US 19, PA 51, PA 60, and PA 837. The project was completed in 2010.

In 2016, a diverging diamond interchange was built at the intersection of US 19 and I-70/79 in South Strabane Township.

PennDOT has started construction on a multi-lane roundabout at the intersection of US 19, US 6, US 322, and PA 98 in Vernon Township, near Meadville. Construction is expected to be completed in October 2019.

PennDOT has also started construction on an intersection improvement project at the northern intersection of US 19 and PA 97. PA 97 will be realigned to meet US 19 at a 90 degree angle, and new left turn lanes and traffic signals will be installed. Construction is expected to be completed in October 2019.

Major intersections
Southern segment
Florida
 in Memphis
 in Terra Ceia. The highways travel concurrently to St. Petersburg.
 in Sugarmill Woods. The highways travel concurrently to Perry.
 in Chiefland
 in Perry
 in Perry. The highways travel concurrently to Capps.
 north-northeast of Capps
 in Monticello
Georgia
 east of Thomasville. The highways travel concurrently to northeast of Thomasville.
 in Albany. The highways travel concurrently through the city.
 southwest of Americus. The highways travel concurrently to Americus.
 southwest of Salem.
 south of Griffin. The highways travel concurrently to Atlanta.
 west of Morrow
 in Forest Park
 on the Atlanta–Hapeville city line
 in Atlanta
 in Atlanta. The highways travel concurrently through the city.
 in Atlanta. US 19/US 78/US 278 travel concurrently through the city.
 in Sandy Springs. The highways travel concurrently through the city.
 in Turners Corner. The highways travel concurrently to Topton, North Carolina.
 in Blairsville.
North Carolina
 in Ranger. US 19/US 64 travel concurrently to Murphy. US 19/US 74 travel concurrently to southwest of Bryson City.
 in Cherokee. The highways travel concurrently through the city.
 in Dellwood. The highways travel concurrently to Lake Junaluska.
 in Lake Junaluska. US 19/US 23 travel concurrently to northeast of Mars Hill. US 19/US 74 travel concurrently to west of Clyde.
 in Asheville
 in Asheville. I-26/US 19 travel concurrently to northeast of Mars Hill. I-240/US 19 travel concurrently through the city.
 in Asheville. US 19/US 70 travel concurrently to Weaverville.
 in Woodfin. The highways travel concurrently to Weaverville.
 in Cane River

Northern segment
Tennessee
 in Bluff City. US 11E/US 19 travel concurrently to Bristol, Virginia.
 in Bristol. The highways travel concurrently to Bristol, Virginia.
Virginia
 in Bristol. The highways travel concurrently to Abingdon.
 in Bristol
 in Claypool Hill. The highways travel concurrently to Bluefield.
West Virginia
 in Bluefield. The highways travel concurrently through the city.
 northeast of Bluefield. The highways travel concurrently to southwest of Princeton.
 south-southeast of Camp Creek
 in Hico
 south-southwest of Sutton. The highways travel concurrently to south-southwest of Flatwoods.
 northwest of Walkersville
 in Weston. The highways travel concurrently through the city.
 in Clarksburg
 in Fairmont. The highways travel concurrently through the city.
 southwest of Westover
 in Morgantown
Pennsylvania
 in Washington Township
 in South Strabane Township
 in South Strabane Township. The highways travel concurrently to Washington.
 in South Strabane Township
 in Pittsburgh.
 in Marshall Township
 in Cranberry Township
 south of Zelienople
 in Muddy Creek Township
 in Findley Township
 in Mercer. The highways travel concurrently to north of Mercer.
 in Vernon Township. US 6/US 19 travel concurrently to LeBoeuf Township. US 19/US 322 travel concurrently to Meadville.
 in Vernon Township
 in LeBoeuf Township
 in Summit Township
 in Erie

See also

 Special routes of U.S. Route 19
 U.S. Route 119
 U.S. Route 219
 U.S. Route 319

References

External links

 
 Endpoints of US highway 19

 
19
19